Bullockia is a genus of flowering plants in the family Rubiaceae. It was originally described as a subgenus of Canthium. The genus is distributed in eastern and southern Africa from Ethiopia to Transvaal, as well as Madagascar in bushland, woodland, savannas, and dry, deciduous forests.

Etymology
Bullockia is a taxonomic anagram derived from the name of the genus Buckollia. The former name is a taxonomic patronym honoring the English botanist Arthur Allman Bullock.

Species
Additional material has been reported from Madagascar, but at the moment remains undescribed.

 Bullockia dyscriton (Bullock) Razafim., Lantz & B.Bremer - Kenya, Tanzania
 Bullockia fadenii (Bridson) Razafim., Lantz & B.Bremer - Kenya
 Bullockia impressinervia (Bridson) Razafim., Lantz & B.Bremer - Tanzania
 Bullockia mombazensis (Baill.) Razafim., Lantz & B.Bremer - Somalia, Kenya, Tanzania, Mozambique
 Bullockia pseudosetiflora (Bridson) Razafim., Lantz & B.Bremer - Kenya, Tanzania, Ethiopia, Uganda
 Bullockia setiflora (Hiern) Razafim., Lantz & B.Bremer - Kenya, Tanzania, Malawi, Zimbabwe, Eswatini, Natal, Transvaal

References

External links 
Bullockia in the World Checklist of Rubiaceae

Rubiaceae genera
Vanguerieae
Flora of Africa
Taxa named by Diane Mary Bridson
Taxa named by Birgitta Bremer